Polypedates insularis (Nicobarese tree frog) is a species of frogs in the family Rhacophoridae.
It is endemic to Great Nicobar Island, India.

Its natural habitats are tropical moist lowland forests and intermittent freshwater marshes.
It is threatened by habitat loss.

References 

insularis
Endemic fauna of the Nicobar Islands
Frogs of India
Amphibians described in 1995
Taxonomy articles created by Polbot